Irwin Larry Eberhart II, better known by his stage name Chip E. (born 1966), is an American DJ and record producer.

Life and career
Born in Chicago, Illinois, Chip E. attended St. Ignatius College Prep, Kenwood Academy, Columbia College and DePaul University. He started spinning records in 1982 and by 1984 he was producing records. In 1985 Street Mix magazine declared Chip E. as the "Godfather of House Music." In 1987, he became the first (and still the only) Chicago artist to be in regular rotation on all three major Chicago radio stations (WBMX, WGCI-FM and B96). Former B96 programming manager Joe Bohannon (Joe Bo) made the decision to add "If You Only Knew" to regular rotation and with that began the transition of the station from CHR (contemporary hit radio) to a dance music station.

Chip E's first recording Jack Trax was an extended play record that featured "Time to Jack" as well as "It's House". These songs are considered by many as the first House record, and the first to use the terms "Jack" and "House" as they relate to the genre.

Chip E. assisted Frankie Knuckles when he co-produced Frankie's first record You Can't Hide. Other artists Chip jump-started into the music world were Lidell Townsell, Kevin Irving, and Harri Dennis of The It. By the age of 21 Chip E. was a worldwide name. Because of difficulties getting out of a contract with D.J. International records, Chip decided that he would rather not record if he had to do it for D.J. International. His first release Jack Trax is one of the most coveted early house music releases, fetching upwards of $1500.00 (USD) on eBay.

Going Underground
Around 1995 Chip E. stopped recording music but could be found doing the rare DJ gig in Britain or Italy; he had moved into "the realms of mythology." However, while  Chip E. wasn't seen much in the music scene, he had resurfaced as a film and DVD guru. Besides work with artists such as Michael McDonald, Fleetwood Mac, Prince, The Dead, and The Black Eyed Peas, Chip E. also produced a feature-length documentary on the subject of house music. The documentary is entitled The UnUsual Suspects - Once Upon a Time in House Music. was released in the summer of 2005.

Back to Jack
In 2017 Chip E. connected with Carl Cox and the two started working on new music. Carl mentioned in the film 2017 that Chip's record "Time to Jack" was the first House/Techno record. Since their connection, Chip has released "Like This" (a remake of his '80s classic) with the group SLAM on Soma Records, "Time 2 Jack" with Carl Cox on Intec Digital, and collaborations with Gettoblaster and Saladin on We Jack and Phunk Junk Records.

Chip E. DJ'd at the 20th Anniversary of the Ultra Music Festival, and the following night joined Carl Cox on stage to premier their collaboration "Time 2 Jack" in March 2018. Since then Chip has been playing festivals around the world including Thailand and Cuba.

See also
List of house music artists

References

External links
 
 
 If You Only Knew (Chip E.) Interview - Gridface webzine
 SPIN's 1986 Feature on Chicago's Club Scene Interview - Spin Magazine
House Music Legend Chip E. Lights Up Chicago November 18 Interview - 5 Magazine

1966 births
Living people
American dance musicians
American electronic musicians
American house musicians
Remixers
Club DJs
DJs from Chicago
St. Ignatius College Prep alumni